Aubrey Hooks (born 18 May 1948) is an American diplomat. He served as United States Ambassador to Côte d'Ivoire from 2004 to 2007 and previously as the United States Ambassador to the Democratic Republic of the Congo from 2001 to 2004 and the United States Ambassador to the Republic of the Congo from 1996 to 1999.

Hooks obtained an M.A. degree in economics from the University of Michigan in 1984. He has a bachelor's degree from the University of South Carolina. Hooks is a Latter-Day Saint.

External links
Profile from the United States Department of State

1948 births
Living people
University of South Carolina alumni
Ambassadors of the United States to Ivory Coast
Ambassadors of the United States to the Democratic Republic of the Congo
Ambassadors of the United States to the Republic of the Congo
University of Michigan alumni
Latter Day Saints from Michigan

Clinton administration personnel
George W. Bush administration personnel
Latter Day Saints from South Carolina
United States Foreign Service personnel